The Trust is a 1915 American short silent drama film directed by Lon Chaney and written by Katherine M. Kingsherry. It starred Lon Chaney and Vera Sisson. The film was also called The Truce in some magazine reviews. The film is today considered to be lost. A still exists showing Chaney as Jim Mason, hanging out in a bar with his criminal associates.

Plot
Jim Mason's (Lon Chaney) marriage is ruined because his wife cannot control her spending, and he is forced to become a thief. His first job is to steal the famous Allison pearls, but while robbing the house, he meets Florence Allison (Vera Sisson), whose marriage is unravelling due to her husband's neglect. Jim, recalling his own tragic marriage, suggests a plan that Florence can use to win back her husband's love. In return, she tells Jim if his plan succeeds, she will let him keep the pearls.

When Mr. Allison returns home after a night on the town, he finds his wife tied up and unconscious, and realizing how his neglect has now endangered her life, he swears off his carousing and returns to a happy marriage with his wife. As the months pass, Jim resists the temptation to sell the pearls. Bill, one of Jim's criminal acquaintances, is convinced that Jim has the pearls and they fight over them. Jim is injured, and drags himself to the Allison home. There he finds that Florence has won back the love of her husband, and she thanks Jim and tells him that  he can keep the pearls.

Cast
 Vera Sisson as Florence Allison
 Lon Chaney as Jim Mason
 T. D. Crittenden as Howard Allison
 William Quinn as Bill

Reception
"There is some vagueness in the construction, but as a whole the story prove quite entertaining and has some novelty in it." --- Moving Picture World

"This story is rather ineffective as it develops with undo rapidity." --- Motion Picture News

References

External links

1915 films
Silent American drama films
American silent short films
American black-and-white films
1915 drama films
1915 short films
Lost American films
Films directed by Lon Chaney
Universal Pictures short films
1915 lost films
Lost drama films
1910s American films